The Good Food Fund (Chinese: 良食基金) is a Chinese food sustainability and health NGO that was founded by Jian Yi and promotes a plant-based diet. It mainly operates by organising conferences such as the yearly Good Food Summit (良食峰会), which took place in 2017 in Yangzhou, in 2018 in Chengdu, in 2019 in Suzhou, and online in 2020. The Fund stated five main areas of concern in 2019: loss of biodiversity and climate change, hunger, unhealthy diets, food waste, abuse of farmed animals.

In November 2020, the donation consultants of Animal Charity Evaluators announced the Good Food Fund as one of its twelve recommended charities, in the second of two tiers. As reasons for their recommendation, they cited the Fund's "strong programmatic work and their commitment to empowering other advocates".

References

External links 
 Good Food Fund review by Animal Charity Evaluators 
 Good Food Fund profile on the website of China Development Brief 

Animal welfare organizations based in China
Food politics
Non-governmental organizations
Organizations associated with effective altruism
Organizations based in Beijing
Plant-based diet organizations